Lists of flying aces in Arab–Israeli wars cover flying aces of the Arab–Israeli conflict. These are military aviators who typically have shot down five or more enemy aircraft. The lists are organized by nationality.

Lists

List of Egyptian flying aces
List of Israeli flying aces
List of Syrian flying aces

Arab–Israeli conflict